Mihai Magdei (born 3 October 1945) is a Moldovan epidemiologist physician and former politician. He served as the Minister of Health of Moldova from 24 January 1997 to 22 May 1998 in the First Ciubuc Cabinet.

References

Moldovan Ministers of Health
Moldovan epidemiologists